is a motorway in the north of the German capital Berlin. It connects the A 10 (Berliner Ring) starting at the Autobahndreieck Pankow over a seven kilometers distance to the main center of Berlin. The motorway was released for traffic between 1973 and 1982.

Exit list

|-
|colspan="2" style="text-align:Center;"||| to Berlin
|}

External links 

114
A114
A114